George March House may refer to:

George March House (Chagrin Falls, Ohio), listed on the National Register of Historic Places in Cuyahoga County, Ohio
George March House (Sandusky, Ohio), listed on the National Register of Historic Places in Erie County, Ohio